Dr. Harrison Holt Richardson (June 16, 1919 - July 17, 1999) was the youngest member of Rear Admiral Richard E. Byrd's United States Antarctic Service Expedition from 1939-1941.  As part of the expedition, Richardson was the first person to record color movie footage of Antarctica.

References

External links 
 Footage of the Antarctic Expedition

1919 births
1999 deaths
United States and the Antarctic
Explorers of Antarctica
People from Beaver, Pennsylvania